
Andrew Aldcorn (c.1792 – 13 August 1877) was an Australian medical practitioner and politician. He served as a nominated member of the Victorian Legislative Council from August to November 1853. He was also a member of the New South Wales Legislative Assembly for one term between 1858 and 1859.

Early life
Aldcorn was born in Oban, Argyll, the son of a John Aldcorn, a Scottish carpenter, and his wife Margaret, née Marshall. He qualified as a doctor in Scotland and developed an extensive practice in Oban. He was an active Presbyterian and sat for many years in the General Assembly of the Church of Scotland but in 1843 joined the breakaway group who formed the new Free Church.  He was heavily involved in the promotion of the Free Church scheme to establish a colony in New Zealand which led to the establishment of the Otago settlement in 1848. Aldcorn himself had invested in a farming enterprise in Victoria Port Phillip District around 1841 (then still part of New South Wales). and in 1853 came out to the colony to inspect his investment.

Victorian Legislative Council
On 29 August 1853, Aldcorn was nominated to the Victorian Legislative Council replacing Archibald Michie. He remained a member until resigning in November 1853.

New South Wales
Aldcorn established a successful medical practice in the Shoalhaven district from around 1854. 
At the 1858 election Aldcorn contested the seat of St Vincent and was elected unopposed. He retired from public life at the next election in 1859.

References

 

1792 births
1877 deaths
Members of the Victorian Legislative Council
Members of the New South Wales Legislative Assembly
Scottish emigrants to colonial Australia
People from Oban
19th-century Australian politicians